Edward "Ted" Magrath (born 12 July 1939) was a rugby union player who represented Australia.

Magrath, a wing, was born in Sydney and claimed a total of 3 international rugby caps for Australia.

References

Australian rugby union players
Australia international rugby union players
1939 births
Living people
Rugby union players from Sydney
Rugby union wings